= Consuming Kids: The Commercialization of Childhood =

Consuming Kids: The Commercialization of Childhood is a 2008 documentary film which explores the "commercialization" of children in the United States.
